Brian Putnam is an American politician from Montana. He is a Republican member of the Montana House of Representatives for district 9.

References 

21st-century American politicians
1970 births
Living people
Republican Party members of the Montana House of Representatives
Politicians from Kalispell, Montana